Waltersburg is an unincorporated community in Fayette County, Pennsylvania, United States. Waltersburg has a post office, with ZIP code 15488.
William Harper retired as postmaster from this location after over 45 years of service. He still resides today with his wife in their home in Waltersburg.

References

Unincorporated communities in Fayette County, Pennsylvania
Unincorporated communities in Pennsylvania